Muhammad Shahzad (born ) is a Pakistani male weightlifter, competing in the 56 kg category and representing Pakistan at international competitions. He participated at the 2014 Asian Games in the 56 kg event.

Major competitions

References

1990 births
Living people
Pakistani male weightlifters
Place of birth missing (living people)
Weightlifters at the 2014 Asian Games
Asian Games competitors for Pakistan